Moskvitch G3 was a sports car from Moskvitch released in 1961 and designed by L. Shugorov. Unlike the earlier G1 and G2 it was more based on the standard models. It used a standard FR layout with independent front suspension (from the Moskvitch 407). The transmission, steering, and rear shocks were borrowed from the Moskvitch 410N. The engine was derived from the Moskvitch 407 engine (but with four K-99 carburetors), producing . In 1963, smaller diameter wheels were fitted and the engine was modified with convex pistons, a new exhaust system, and special camshafts. Three G3's were planned, but only one was built. The G3 was retired in 1965.

Sports cars
G3
Motorsport in the Soviet Union